The 2014 Texas Senate elections took place as part of the biennial United States elections. Texas voters elected state senators in 15 of the 31 state senate districts. State senators serve four-year terms in the Texas State Senate. A statewide map of Texas's state Senate districts can be obtained from the Texas Legislative Council here, and individual district maps can be obtained from the U.S. Census here.

Following the 2012 State Senate elections, the Republicans maintained effective control of the Senate with nineteen members to the Democrats' twelve. As of 2020, this is the last time Republicans have gained seats in the senate in a regularly-scheduled election.

To claim control of the chamber from Republicans, the Democrats needed to gain four seats.  While the GOP's statewide margin of victory for this class of Senators fell 4.3 percentage points compared to that of the 2012 elections, nearly all of the decrease was due to greater support for third-party candidates; the Democrats' vote share remained practically the same. In the end, the Republicans flipped one Democrat-held seat, winning twelve out of the fifteen races. Notably, the Libertarian Party fielded candidates in more races than the Democratic Party; as of 2020, this is the last time this has occurred.

Summary of race results

Notes

References

senate
Texas Senate
Texas State Senate elections